Anton Summer (born 23 November 1967) is an Austrian judoka. He competed in the men's half-middleweight event at the 1992 Summer Olympics.

References

External links
 

1967 births
Living people
Austrian male judoka
Olympic judoka of Austria
Judoka at the 1992 Summer Olympics
Sportspeople from Vienna
20th-century Austrian people